Radical 173 or radical rain meaning "rain" is one of the 9 Kangxi radicals (214 radicals in total) composed of 8 strokes. This radical character transforms into  when used as an upper component.

In the Kangxi Dictionary, there are 298 characters (out of 49,030) to be found under this radical.

 is also the 170th indexing component in the Table of Indexing Chinese Character Components predominantly adopted by Simplified Chinese dictionaries published in mainland China, with the component form  listed as its associated indexing component.

Evolution

Derived characters

Variant forms 
This radical is printed and written differently in modern Traditional Chinese than in other languages. In Chinese as used in Mainland China (whether Simplified or Traditional) and Japanese, the four dots in the character are almost identical, while in modern standard Traditional Chinese as used in Taiwan and Hong Kong, the four dots point inwards to the center of the character, despite the former form is also widely used in Traditional Chinese publications.

Literature

References

External links

Unihan Database - U+96E8

173
170